French Street is a streetcar station in Charlotte, North Carolina. The at-grade island platform on Beatties Ford Road is the western terminus of the CityLynx Gold Line and serves the Biddleville neighborhood.

Location 
French Street station is located on Beatties Ford Road, between French Street and Mill Road. The Biddleville neighborhood, part of West End, is noted as Charlotte's oldest surviving black neighborhood, beginning in 1871. The immediate area has a few businesses and churches, with single-family homes west off Beatties Ford Road. The  Five Points Park is located nearby.

History 
French Street station was approved as a Gold Line Phase 2 stop in 2013, with construction beginning in Fall 2016. Though it was slated to open in early-2020, various delays pushed out the opening till mid-2021. The station opened to the public on August 30, 2021.

Station layout 
The station consists of an island platform with two passenger shelters; a crosswalk and ramp provide platform access from Beatties Ford Road. North of the platform is the (non-passenger) layover area, where the streetcar goes to switch tracks and wait periodically. The station's passenger shelters house two art installations by George Bates. The windscreens are titled: The Worth of That, is That Which It Contains and That is This, and This With Thee Remains. The title comes from a 1954 JCSU yearbook excerpt referencing Shakespeare's sonnet 74. The micro and macro figures and images share the specific and general history of the area.

References

External links
 
 Historic West End

Lynx Gold Line stations
Railway stations in the United States opened in 2021
2021 establishments in North Carolina